Nahoum & Sons Pvt. Limited is an Indian bakery shop situated in West Bengal. It is one of the oldest surviving shops in Kolkata owned by the Jewish family. The products of Nahoum & Sons at Christmas are a part of the culture of Kolkata. Various famous personalities of India have eaten this foods of this bakery.

History
Nahoum Israel Mordecai was a Baghdadi Jew who was the founder of the shop. It was founded 26 years after the establishment of New Market in the city. The Hog Market could be seen from the front of the shop. He changed the location of the shop 14 years after the establishment of the bakery. His son Elias took the responsibility of the shop from second generation. After his death in 1964 his son David Nahoum from third generation of the family took up the responsibility to manage the shop. His brothers Norman and Solomon had the responsibility of store at various times. After death of David in 2013, his brother Issac took the responsibility.

Ownership
 First generation: Nahoum Israel Mordecai
 Second generation: Elias Nahoum
 Third generation: Norman Elias Nahoum, Solomon Elias Nahoum, David Elias Nahoum (1964–2013), Issac Elias Nahoum (2013–present)

Products
Nahoum & Sons offers: 
 Biscuit
 Egg chap
 Pantras
 Macron cake
 Brownie cake
 Fragrant marzipan-fudge cake 
 Plain cake Madeira
 Honey Light plum cake
 Royal special fruit cake 
 Plum Pudding cake
 Rich plum cake
 Black forest cake
 Pizza
 Minced pie tart
 Cheese Samosa
 Baklava
 Challah
 Rum balls
 Cheese puffs.

Legend
It is said that Geoffrey Fisher once visited the bakery in Kolkata, India. The archbishop of Canterbury ate the fruit cake of the shop and praised it. Although this story is considered as a legend.

References

Baghdadi Jews
Culture of Kolkata
Bakeries of India
Confectionery companies of India
Indian companies established in 1902